The genus Eumeces (family Scincidae) comprises four African to Middle-Eastern skink species.

Systematics
Recently two taxonomic revisions have been made regarding the 19th century genus Eumeces. They both resulted in similar results; the genus is paraphyletic and must be "sliced up" into several different genera. Griffith et al. (2000) proposed that the type species for Eumeces, E. pavimentatus, which is considered by many to be a subspecies of Eumeces schneiderii, should be changed to Lacerta fasciata, so that the genus name Eumeces would stay with the most species-rich clade. However, this petition has not been verified by the International Commission on Zoological Nomenclature. Schimtz et al. argued that Griffith et al. violated the Code and rejected the proposal on good grounds. Thus only the African species of the Eumeces schneiderii group belong to the genus Eumeces.

Within Eumeces the following species are recognized: 
Eumeces algeriensis – Algerian skink
Eumeces blythianus – Blyth's skink
Eumeces cholistanensis
Eumeces indothalensis – striped mole skink
Eumeces persicus – Persian striped skink
Eumeces schneiderii – Schneider's skink
Some species that were formerly considered Eumeces have now been assigned to new genera:

Now in Plestiodon:

Plestiodon anthracinus, coal skink
Plestiodon barbouri, Barbour's skink (Japan)
Plestiodon brevirostris, short-nosed skink (Mexico)
Plestiodon callicephalus, North American mountain skink
Plestiodon capito
Plestiodon chinensis, Chinese skink (East Asia: China, Korea, Japan)
Plestiodon colimensis (Mexico)
Plestiodon copei (Mexico)
Plestiodon coreensis, Korean big skink (Korea)
Plestiodon dugesii (Mexico) - rare
Plestiodon egregius, mole skink
Plestiodon elegans, elegant skink, five-striped blue-tailed skink (juvenile), or Shanghai skink (East Asia)
Plestiodon fasciatus, common five-lined skink
Plestiodon gilberti, Gilbert's skink (North America)
Plestiodon inexpectatus, southeastern five-lined skink
Plestiodon kishinouyei, Kishinoue's giant skink
Plestiodon lagunensis, San Lucan skink
Plestiodon laticeps, broad-headed skink
Plestiodon latiscutatus, Okada's Five-lined Skink (Japan)
Plestiodon liui (Asia)

Plestiodon longirostris, Bermuda rock skink
Plestiodon lynxe, oak forest skink (Mexico)
Plestiodon marginatus, Ryūkyū five-lined skink (Okinawa and Amami Islands)
Plestiodon multilineatus
Plestiodon multivirgatus, many-lined skink
Plestiodon (multivirgatus) gaigeae, variable skink (North America) - sometimes Eumeces (multivirgatus) epipleurotus
Plestiodon obsoletus, Great Plains skink
Plestiodon ochoterenae
Plestiodon okadae, Okada's five-lined skink (Japan)
Plestiodon parviauriculatus, northern pygmy skink (Mexico)
Plestiodon parvulus, southern pygmy skink (Mexico)
Plestiodon popei (Asia)
Plestiodon quadrilineatus, four-lined Asian skink
Plestiodon septentrionalis, prairie skink - includes Eumeces obtusirostris
Plestiodon skiltonianus, western skink
Plestiodon stimpsonii, Yaeyama seven-lined skink (Japan)
Plestiodon sumichrasti (Mexico)
Plestiodon tamdaoensis
Plestiodon tetragrammus, four-lined skink
Plestiodon tunganus

Now in Eurylepis:
Eumeces indothalensis - now Eurylepis indothalensis
Eumeces poonaensis - now Eurylepis poonaensis
Eumeces taeniolatus - now Eurylepis taeniolata

Now in Mesoscincus:
Eumeces altamirani - now Mesoscincus altamirani
Eumeces managuae - now Mesoscincus managuae
Eumeces schwartzei - now Mesoscincus schwartzei

References
  (2006): Using ancient and recent DNA to explore relationships of extinct and endangered Leiolopisma skinks (Reptilia: Scincidae) in the Mascarene islands. Molecular Phylogenetics and Evolution 39 (2): 503–511.  (HTML abstract)
 Griffith, H., A. Ngo & R.W. Murphy. 2000. A cladistic evaluation of the cosmopolitan genus Eumeces Wiegmann (Reptilia, Squamata, Scincidae). Russ. J. Herpetol. 7 (1): 1-16. ("Novoeumeces gen nov.", p. 11).
 Schmitz, Andreas; Patrick Mausfeld and Dirk Embert. 2004. Molecular studies on the genus Eumeces Wiegmann, 1834: phylogenetic relationships and taxonomic implications. Hamadryad 28 (1-2): 73–89.
 Smith, Hobart M. 2005. Plestiodon: a Replacement Name for Most Members of the Genus Eumeces in North America. Journal of Kansas Herpetology (14): 15-16.

External links

Eumeces
Skinks of Africa
Lizards of Asia
Lizard genera
Taxa named by Arend Friedrich August Wiegmann